Marc Lloyd Williams (born 8 February 1973) is a Welsh former footballer. He is the Welsh Premier League's all-time top scorer, with 319 goals.

Career
Williams was born in Bangor, and brought up in Llanberis. He has played for a number of clubs including recently Bangor City (5 spells), TNS, Stockport County, Haugesund,  York City, Aberystwyth Town, Halifax Town, Southport, Altrincham, Colwyn Bay, Porthmadog (2 spells), Newtown (2 spells) and Rhyl.

Other honours include Wales B international appearances. Welsh Premier championship medal (3), Welsh Cup winner's medal (twice), Welsh Premier Golden Boot award (twice) and Norwegian First Division Championship medal.

Williams was the highest scorer in all European leagues with 47 goals in the 2001–02 season, but did not win the European Golden Boot as the Welsh Premier League has a lower co-efficient than some of Europe's bigger leagues. He joined Southport in July 2002. He then returned to Bangor in February 2003. Williams then joined Aberystwyth Town in June 2003, and probably enjoyed one of the best spells of his career, playing attractive football and scoring freely.

Williams returned to Bangor City in July 2006. Williams left Bangor in 2007 to join Rhyl FC, where he made 20 appearances scoring 16 goals, he then joined Newtown where he made 11 appearances scoring 5 goals. He returned to his roots rejoining Porthmadog for the start of the 2008–09 season.

In October 2010 he signed for again for Newtown.

He is currently the all-time top scorer in the League of Wales, with 319 goals in 467 appearances.

Career statistics

Honours
 League of Wales Player of the Season: 2001–02
 Welsh Premier League Team of the Year: 2004–05

References

External links

Marc Lloyd Williams Welsh Premier career stats
Welsh Premier legends 
Welsh Premier League Football - Lloyd Williams is triple centurion

1973 births
Living people
People from Llanberis
Sportspeople from Gwynedd
Welsh footballers
Association football forwards
Porthmadog F.C. players
Bangor City F.C. players
Stockport County F.C. players
FK Haugesund players
Altrincham F.C. players
Halifax Town A.F.C. players
York City F.C. players
Southport F.C. players
Aberystwyth Town F.C. players
Colwyn Bay F.C. players
The New Saints F.C. players
Airbus UK Broughton F.C. players
Cymru Premier players
English Football League players
Footballers from Bangor, Gwynedd
Newtown A.F.C. players
Rhyl F.C. players
Wales semi-pro international footballers